Claim to Fame is a novel by Margaret Peterson Haddix published by Simon & Schuster Children's Publishing in 2009.

Plot summary
It was a talent that came out of nowhere. One day, Lindsay Scott was on the top of the world, the child star of a hit TV show. The next day her fame had turned into torture. Every time anyone said anything about her, anywhere in the world, she heard it: praise, criticism, back-stabbing… Lindsay had what looked like a nervous breakdown and vanished from the public eye. Now she’s sixteen, and a tabloid newspaper claims that her own father is holding her hostage. The truth is much stranger, but that tabloid article sets off a chain of events that forces Lindsay to finally confront who she really is.

Reception
Kirkus Reviews wrote "The veteran writer has the ability to make her characters recognizable even with brief sketches, and she holds attention with the mounting suspense of Lindsay’s dilemma, especially when her choices turn out to be wrong. An intriguing and often exciting diversion for young readers." while Publishers Weekly said "If everything wraps up a bit quickly, Haddix nonetheless creates a thought-provoking story laced with themes of transcendentalism, self-centeredness, and the importance of human connectivity."

References

External links
Claim to Fame on Margaret Peterson Haddix's Official Website
Claim to Fame on Simon & Schuster Website

Novels by Margaret Peterson Haddix
2009 American novels